Secondo De Marchi (July 30, 1911 – April 18, 1996) was an Italian boxer who competed in the 1936 Summer Olympics. In 1936 he was eliminated in the second round of the heavyweight class after losing his fight to Anthony Stuart. During World War II, De Marchi had Italian people hiding in the attic of his boxing school in Rotterdam.

References

External links
Secondo De Marchi's profile at Sports Reference.com

1911 births
1996 deaths
Heavyweight boxers
Olympic boxers of Italy
Boxers at the 1936 Summer Olympics
Italian male boxers
20th-century Italian people